Lirentelimab (sold under the brand name AK002) is a humanized nonfucosylated monoclonal antibody that targets sialic acid-binding Ig-like lectin 8 (SIGLEC8). In a randomized clinical trial, lirentelimab was found to improve eosinophil counts and symptoms in individuals with eosinophilic gastritis and duodenitis. Adverse reactions include infusion reactions, which are mild to moderate and typically occur following the first infusion.

Mechanism of action 
In individuals with asthma, Siglec-8 expression is increased on the surface of eosinophils and mast cells in sputum. Lirentelimab depletes eosinophils via antibody-dependent natural killer cell mediated cytotoxicity.

Pharmacology 
Lirentelimab is a humanized, nonfucosylated IgG1 monoclonal antibody that targets Siglec-8. Siglec-8 is an inhibitory receptor present on eosinophils and mast cells, with low level expression on basophils. Interleukin-5, granulocyte-macrophage colony stimulating factor, and interleukin-33 enhance anti-Siglec-8 mediated destruction of eosinophils. Lirentelimab inhibits mast cells' IgE-mediated degranulation and de novo synthesis of prostaglandin D2 in vitro.

Adverse events
Mild-to-moderate infusion reactions may occur with lirentelimab, which tend to occur following the first infusion only.

Research 
Lirentelimab has been studied for the treatment of chronic spontaneous urticaria, indolent systemic mastocytosis, and severe allergic conjunctivitis.

References

External links 
 

Monoclonal antibodies